Zagazig University Stadium is a multi-purpose stadium in Zagazig, Egypt. It is part of Zagazig University. It is currently used mostly for football matches and hosts the home games of Sharkia SC. The stadium holds 30,000 people.

References

Zagazig
Populated places in Sharqia Governorate